Carsten Kusch (born 4 January 1967) is a German water polo player. He competed in the men's tournament at the 1992 Summer Olympics.

References

1967 births
Living people
German male water polo players
Olympic water polo players of Germany
Water polo players at the 1992 Summer Olympics
Water polo players from Berlin